Ståle Oldeide (born 25 December 1966) is a retired Norwegian football goalkeeper.

Starting his career in Åkra IL, he joined regional greats Bryne FK in 1987. Oldeide was bought by ambitious Lyn Fotball in 1994. Failing to secure promotion to Eliteserien, he did however score a penalty in 1994. In 1996 he went on loan to Åkra, and from there to FK Haugesund as the newly promoted first-tier team's reserve goalkeeper in 1997. In 1998 he did not play, but spent time on loan in Viborg FF in the spring. After that he spent about fifteen years on the books of Åkra.

Oldeide was a substitute for the 1987 Norwegian Football Cup Final, which Bryne won, and played the 1994 Norwegian Football Cup Final, which Lyn lost.

References

1966 births
Living people
People from Karmøy
Norwegian footballers
Bryne FK players
Lyn Fotball players
FK Haugesund players
Norwegian First Division players
Eliteserien players
Viborg FF players
Danish 1st Division players
Norwegian expatriate footballers
Expatriate men's footballers in Denmark
Norwegian expatriate sportspeople in Denmark
Association football goalkeepers
Sportspeople from Rogaland